Maggie Flynn is a 1968 musical with a book by Morton DaCosta and music and lyrics by Hugo Peretti, Luigi Creatore, and George David Weiss.

Based on an idea by John Flaxman, it was inspired by a true story set in the New York Draft Riots of 1863. The title character, an Irish woman providing asylum for orphaned children of refugee slaves, is on the verge of marrying a Union Army colonel. Her vagabond husband Phineas Flynn (who abandoned her to pursue a theatrical career and whom she had presumed was dead) returns to the scene. The cast of characters includes Confederate insurgents, prostitutes and drunks, bigoted socialites, circus performers, and some African-American kids endangered by the draft riots.

Production
The Broadway production, directed by DaCosta and choreographed by Brian Macdonald, opened on October 23, 1968, at the ANTA Playhouse, where it ran for 82 performances and 6 previews. The cast included Shirley Jones and husband Jack Cassidy, who was nominated for the Tony Award for Best Actor in a Musical, and Robert Kaye as Col. John Farraday. Among the orphans were newcomers Irene Cara, Giancarlo Esposito, and Stephanie Mills.

Critics found the basic situation of Jones and the children threatened by political unrest to be too similar to The Sound of Music, albeit told in an unrelentingly darker manner. They thought that efforts to equate the New York Draft Riots with contemporary protests against the Vietnam War were heavy-handed and counter-productive. "It is worth noting that two of the first night critics came up with the same line, calling Maggie Flynn the best Broadway musical since Her First Roman — thereby honoring a desperately lousy mishmash that opened three days earlier."

An original cast recording was released by RCA Victor and re-released on CD by DRG in 2009.

Plot
During the American Civil War, Maggie Flynn, a young Irish woman living in New York City, marries Phineas, a charming scoundrel who leaves her to join the circus. Maggie runs an orphanage for black orphans, and soon is engaged to Colonel John Farraday, a steady and faithful beau. However, Phineas, now called "The Clown," returns to win back his wife. They become caught up in the New York Draft Riots of 1863,  and the orphanage is burned down.

Songs

Act I
 Never Gonna Make Me Fight
 It's a Nice Cold Morning
 I Wouldn't Have You Any Other Way
 Learn How to Laugh
 Maggie Flynn
 The Thank You Song
 Look Around Your Little World
 Maggie Flynn (Reprise)
 I Won't Let It Happen Again
 How About a Ball?
 Pitter Patter
 I Won't Let It Happen Again (Reprise)

Act II
 Never Gonna Make Me Fight (Reprise)
 Why Can't I Walk Away?
 The Game of War
 Mr. Clown
 Pitter Patter (Reprise)
 The Riot
 Don't You Think It's Very Nice?
 Mr. Clown (Reprise)
 Maggie Flynn (Reprise)

Award nomination
 1969 Tony Award for Best Actor in a Musical - Jack Cassidy

Notes

References
 'Not Since Carrie:' Forty Years of Broadway Musical Flops by Ken Mandelbaum, St. Martin's Press (1991), pages 90–91
Open a New Window: The Broadway Musical in the 1960s by Ethan Mordden, Palgrave (2001), pages 213-15

External links
 Internet Broadway Database listing

1968 musicals
Broadway musicals